KNRC-LD, virtual and UHF digital channel 14, is a low-powered Estrella TV-affiliated television station licensed to Reno, Nevada, United States. The station is owned by FMI Media.

In May 2012, KNRC-DT1 was added to Spectrum cable in Reno, Sparks, and Washoe County on channel 304.

Digital channels
The station's digital signal is multiplexed:

References

External links
KNRC website
Estrella TV Reno website
Better Life Broadcasting website

Estrella TV affiliates
NRC-LD
Television channels and stations established in 2010
2010 establishments in Nevada
Low-power television stations in the United States